George Stephens may refer to:

George Stephens (playwright) (1800–1851), English author and dramatist
George Stephens (philologist) (1813–1895), British archaeologist and philologist, who worked in Scandinavia
George Washington Stephens, Sr. (1832–1904), Canadian businessman, lawyer, and politician
George Washington Stephens, Jr. (1866–1942), Canadian politician
Frank Stephens (sculptor) (George Francis Stephens, 1859–1935), sculptor and co-founder of Arden, Delaware
George Stephens (Canadian politician) (1846–1916), merchant and politician in Ontario, Canada
George E. Stephens (1832–1888), American Civil War Union correspondent to the New York Weekly Anglo-African
George Stephens (priest) (died 1751), Canon of Windsor
George Stephens (American football) (1873–1946), college football player
George Stephens (cricketer) (1889–1950), English cricketer

See also
George Stevens (disambiguation)
George Stephen (disambiguation)